Girija Shettar (born 20 July 1969) is a British actress, known for her works in South Indian films. In 1989, Shettar starred in Maniratnam's Telugu film  Geethanjali and Malayalam film Vandanam, directed by Priyadarshan, in which she starred alongside Mohanlal.

In 1992, she signed for the lead female role in Jo Jeeta Wohi Sikandar, which she left mid-way to complete a prior commitment. Ayesha Julka replaced her after the first schedule. In the same year, she starred in another Telugu film Hrudayanjali, under the direction of A. Raghurami Reddy, which won four Nandhi Awards by Government of Andra Pradesh. The film was completed in 1992 but was released only in 2002.

Personal life 
Girija Shettar was born on 20 July 1969 in Orsett, Essex to a Kannada doctor father and a British mother. From the age of 18, Girija trained in Bharatanatyam. She completed a doctoral thesis in Integral Yoga Philosophy and Indian spiritual psychology from Cardiff University in 2003. She spends as much time as possible at Sri Aurobindo Ashram in Puducherry. Girija is currently a writer based in London. Previously working for a medical technology newsletter, she is now writing for a shipping magazine. A booklet of haiku poetry entitled "This Year, Daffodils" was published by Survivors' Poetry and the Esmee Fairburn Foundation, 2011. In 2014, she won Social Media Journalist of the Year as senior reporter for IHS Maritime Fairplay at Seahorse Journalist Awards, London.

After the release of Geethanjali, she appeared on the front page of Screen (magazine), India 30 June 1989 issue. In 2002, Geethanjali was one of five films shown at the British Film Institute during a retrospective of Mani Ratnam's work. The films were chosen as examples of strong heroine roles in Indian films.

Filmography

References

External links 
 

Living people
1969 births
People from Orsett
Auroville
Actresses from Puducherry
British film actresses
British actresses of Indian descent
Kannada people
British expatriate actresses in India
Actresses in Telugu cinema
Actresses in Malayalam cinema
Actresses in Hindi cinema
European actresses in India
Actresses of European descent in Indian films
English-language haiku poets
20th-century British actresses
21st-century British actresses